Iryna Mykhalchenko (born 20 January 1972) is a Ukrainian high jumper.

Biography

Mykhalchenko competed in two Olympic Games, finishing fifth in the high jump contest at the 2004 Summer Olympics. She then finished second at the 2004 IAAF World Athletics Final, third at the 2005 IAAF World Athletics Final and sixth in the 2006 European Athletics Championships.

Her personal best performance is 2.01 metres, achieved in July 2004 at the Internationales Hochsprung-Meeting Eberstadt, placing her in the elite Female two metres club.

Competition record

See also
Female two metres club

External links

1972 births
Living people
Ukrainian female high jumpers
Athletes (track and field) at the 2004 Summer Olympics
Olympic athletes of Ukraine
Ukrainian masters athletes
Competitors at the 1999 Summer Universiade
21st-century Ukrainian women